Siopili Perez is a Tokelauan politician. He served as the Head of Government of Tokelau from 23 February 2015 to 8 March 2016, from 6 March 2017 to 5 March 2018 and from 19 May 2022 until 6 March 2023. 

Perez was also  (leader) of Nukunonu atoll from 2014 until 2023 when he was succeeded by Alipati Tavite.

References 

20th-century births
Heads of Government of Tokelau
Living people
People from Nukunonu
Year of birth missing (living people)